Sandy Arissol is a member of the National Assembly of Seychelles.  A laboratory technician by profession, he is a member of the Seychelles National Party, and was first elected to the Assembly in 2007.

References

Year of birth missing (living people)
Living people
Members of the National Assembly (Seychelles)
People from Saint Louis, Seychelles
Seychelles National Party politicians